Sail Rock is the remaining uppermost part of a submerged volcanic edifice lying 7 nautical miles (13 km) southwest of Deception Island in the South Shetland Islands, Antarctica. It is 20 m long in southwest-northeast direction, 12 m wide and 30 m high. From a distance, the rock is reported to resemble a ship under sail, but at close range it is more like a house with a gable roof. The feature's name, which dates back to at least 1822, was probably given by sealers.

Location

Maps 
 Chart of South Shetland including Coronation Island, &c. from the exploration of the sloop Dove in the years 1821 and 1822 by George Powell Commander of the same. Scale ca. 1:200000. London: Laurie, 1822
 South Shetland Islands: Deception Island. Scale 1:50000 map. Insets: Sail Rock 1:10000. UK Antarctic Place-names Committee, 2010
 Antarctic Digital Database (ADD). Scale 1:250000 topographic map of Antarctica. Scientific Committee on Antarctic Research (SCAR). Since 1993, regularly updated

Notes

References
 Sail Rock. SCAR Composite Antarctic Gazetteer
 S. Kraus, A. Kurbatov and M. Yates. Geochemical signatures of tephras from Quaternary Antarctic Peninsula volcanoes. Andean Geology 40 (2013) 1. pp. 1–40

Landforms of the South Shetland Islands
Rock formations of the South Shetland Islands